The Concordia yawl is a class of wooden yawl sailboats; it was designed in 1938 by the naval architect C. Raymond Hunt with input from Llewellyn and Waldo Howland, Clinton Crane, Fenwick Williams and Frank Paine.
Earlier that year, the Colin Archer-designed Norwegian pilot cutter, Escape, belonging to Llewellyn Howland's family, was destroyed by the Great Hurricane of 1938. Howland subsequently commissioned the Concordia Company, which he had founded in 1926 and at the time was run by his son Waldo, to design and build a replacement. Howland wanted a sailboat that could be used for both cruising and racing and withstand the heavy wind and choppy waters of Buzzards Bay; thus the Concordia design number fourteen, a 39'10" yawl, was created.  

There were 103 Concordias produced between 1938 and 1966, making the Concordia yawl class the largest class of large one-design wooden sailboats. The first four Concordias were produced in Massachusetts. Concordia commissioned the Abeking & Rasmussen shipyard in Lemwerder, Germany, to build the remaining 99 (26 of them as a 41' Model).
102 of the 103 Concordias are still in existence today.

Over the years, the Concordia yawl has won numerous races including the prestigious Newport Bermuda Race (1954 and 1978), the Annapolis Race (1955), at Cowes Week (1955) and the Marblehead to Halifax Ocean Race (1955 and 1997).
 1954 Newport Bermuda Race - Malay, Concordia #2, Dan Strohmeier
 1955 Annapolis Race - Actaea, Concordia #17, Henry Sears
 1955 Cowes Week - Harrier, Concordia #30, Ray Hunt
 1955 Marblehead-to-Halifax Race - Malay, Concordia #2, Dan Strohmeier.
 1978 Newport Bermuda Race - Babe, Concordia #26, Arnold Gay
 1997 Marblehead-to-Halifax Race - Crocodile, Concordia #67, Robert Crocker.

The Concordia yawls Arapaho, hull #85 and Irian, hull #70 (both 41' models), appeared in the movie Message in a Bottle.

Concordia yawl specifications

Construction - oak keel, steam bent laminated oak frames, African mahogany planking, bright mahogany deck trim, canvas covered main deck and house top, bronze plank fastenings, galvanized iron keel bolts
Rig - hollow spars, including spinnaker pole, stainless steel rigging, galvanized tangs, bronze fittings and winches
Sails - mainsail, mizzen and jib, Dacron; running rigging, Dacron
Engine - Gray 4 cyl. 31 H.P., cockpit controls
Propeller - 2-blade solid on centerline
Plumbing and tanks - toilet and lavatory with pump in wash room, sink and pump in galley, built-in bilge pump; three Nirosta water tanks of approximately  total capacity; one  Nirosta gasoline tank
Cabin equipment - 2 special folding berths forward, 2 Concordia berths in main cabin, transom cushions, Kapoc berth mattresses, cabin table, ice box of 75 lbs capacity, alcohol stove 7 electric lights, 1 kerosene lamp, panelled pine bulkheads, locust trim
Other equipment - electric running and riding lights, anchor and warp, boat hook, flag staff, canvas bucket, mop, few tools, fenders, life ring, dock lines, compass and binnacle, life lines, pulpit dinghy chocks, hatch and skylight covers

References

External links 
 Abeking & Rasmussen
 Concordia Company
 C. Raymond Hunt Associates 
 Lloyd, Barbara "YACHTING; Concordia Celebrates 50th Year Afloat", New York Times, August 21, 1988.
 Styan, Christina "Concordia Yawl owners sail into Padanaram Harbor", The Standard Times, August 13, 2008.

Yawls